Fort Liard Airport  is located adjacent to Fort Liard, Northwest Territories, Canada. North Cariboo Air offers charter services from the airport.

References

External links

Registered aerodromes in the Dehcho Region